The 2022 Indiana Hoosiers men's soccer team represented Indiana University Bloomington in men's college soccer during the 2022 NCAA Division I men's soccer season and 2022 Big Ten Conference men's soccer season. It was the 50th season the university fielded a men's varsity soccer program, and the 32nd season the program played in the Big Ten Conference. Indiana played their home games at Bill Armstrong Stadium and were coached by 13th-year head coach, Todd Yeagley.

Team

Roster

Coaching staff

Schedule 

|-
!colspan=8 style=""| Preseason

|-
!colspan=8 style=""| Regular season
|-

|-
!colspan=8 style=""|

|-
!colspan=8 style=""|

References

External links 
 IU Men's Soccer

2022
American men's college soccer teams 2022 season
2022 Big Ten Conference men's soccer season
2022 NCAA Division I Men's Soccer Tournament participants
2022 in sports in Indiana
2022